ATK Football Club, commonly known as ATK and formerly known as Atlético de Kolkata, was an Indian professional football club based in Kolkata, West Bengal. The club competed in the Indian Super League, the top flight of Indian football and were the league champions during the inaugural 2014, 2016 and 2019–20 seasons respectively.

The club was owned by Kolkata Games and Sports Pvt. Ltd. which consists of former Indian cricket captain Sourav Ganguly, alongside businessmen Harshavardhan Neotia, Sanjiv Goenka and Utsav Parekh Initially, for the first three seasons, Spanish La Liga club Atlético Madrid was also a co-owner; later Goenka bought the shares owned by Atlético Madrid. After the end of their partnership with the Spanish giant, Atlético de Kolkata has been rechristened to ATK in July 2017. The team's name and colours are derived from their former Spanish partner.

Under coach Antonio López Habas, Atlético hosted and won the first match of the Indian Super League. They won the inaugural season, beating Kerala Blasters 0–1 in the final. Two years later, under José Francisco Molina, the team won on penalties against the same opponent in the final. Currently, ATK holds the most ISL trophies with 3, defeating Chennaiyin FC in the 2020 final.

On 16 January 2020, it was announced that the RPSG Group along with former cricketer Sourav Ganguly and businessmen Utsav Parekh, had bought an 80% stake in Mohun Bagan Football Club (India) Pvt. Ltd. the legal entity owning the I-League club, Mohun Bagan FC. As a result, it was also announced that ATK would merge with Mohun Bagan to form ATK Mohun Bagan FC Pvt. Ltd.  on 1 June 2020.

History

Foundation
In March 2014, it was announced that the All India Football Federation, the national federation for football in India, and IMG-Reliance would be accepting bids for ownership of eight of nine selected cities for the upcoming Indian Super League, an eight-team franchise league modeled along the lines of the Indian Premier League cricket tournament. On 13 April 2014, it was announced that Sourav Ganguly, Harshavardhan Neotia, Sanjiv Goenka, Utsav Parekh, and Spanish La Liga side Atlético Madrid had won the bid for the Kolkata franchise. It turned out to be the most expensive franchise, being purchased for 180 million (around US$3 million). On 7 May 2014, the team was officially launched as Atlético de Kolkata.

Inaugural season

The club signed their first player on 4 July 2014 with the acquisition of former Real Madrid midfielder Borja Fernández. The team then went on to sign two more Spaniards: their first head coach, Antonio López Habas, and marquee player, former UEFA Champions League winner Luis García, on 8 July 2014. Luis García was named the first marquee player of the season.

The first Indian signing by the club took place in round one of the 2014 ISL Inaugural Domestic Draft in which Atlético de Kolkata selected Cavin Lobo, midfielder for the city's I-League team East Bengal FC, with their pick. They were the biggest spenders in the draft with an expenditure of 39.1 million, their biggest signing being Sanju Pradhan for 7 million. In the International Draft, four of Atlético de Kolkata's allotted seven picks were Spaniards, including defender Josemi, a UEFA Champions League winner with Liverpool in 2005. On 6 September, the team bolstered their midfield with the acquisition of Mamunul Islam, captain of the Bangladesh national team, who stated that the move would help relations between East Bengal (Bangladesh) and West Bengal.

The club played their first match on 12 October 2014 at home against Mumbai City FC in the opening Indian Super League match. Fikru Teferra scored the first goal in team and league history in the 27th minute as Atlético de Kolkata went on to win 3–0.

By finishing third in the league, the club qualified for the end-of-season play-offs, where they advanced via a penalty shootout past FC Goa in the semi-finals after a goalless draw. At the final against the Kerala Blasters at the DY Patil Stadium in Mumbai, Atlético won 1–0 with an added-time goal by Mohammed Rafique. At the end of season awards, García was named the Most Exciting Player.

2015 season

On 5 June 2015, the team acquired Canadian international forward Iain Hume, whose five goals had helped Kerala to the final of the previous season. In the second season's domestic draft, Atlético de Kolkata had the first pick, choosing Pune F.C. goalkeeper Amrinder Singh for a fee of 450,000; their most expensive purchase was that of defender Augustin Fernandes for 2.6 million. On 29 July, with García released due to his injury record, the team brought in Portugal international forward Hélder Postiga as their new marquee player; aged 32, he became the youngest such player in the league. García's role as captain was taken on by his compatriot Borja.

Postiga scored twice in Atlético's first game of the season, a 3–2 win at Chennaiyin FC, but was substituted later in the match due to injury, and missed the rest of the campaign. Pelé, regarded as one of the greatest footballers of all time, watched the 2–1 win over Kerala at the Salt Lake Stadium on 13 October, Atlético's first home game of the season. Hume scored two hat-tricks in November, in 4–1 wins against Mumbai City, and FC Pune City. The latter result made the team the first to qualify for the play-offs, where they lost 4–2 on aggregate to Chennaiyin.

2016 season

In March 2016, it was reported that López Habas would leave the club due to concerns over his ₹23.5 million ($350,000) annual salary. On 25 April, he left for Pune. On 3 May, he was replaced by another Spaniard, former Villarreal manager José Francisco Molina. Postiga returned to be the marquee again, but suffered another long-term injury early into the second game of the season. The club's ownership admitted that they had wanted a different marquee due to his record, but had been unable to sign one.

Atlético de Kolkata finished in fourth place, taking the final position in the finals, and were drawn against first-place Mumbai in the semi-finals. They hosted a 3–2 win in the first leg, with all goals in the first half, including two by Hume, and advanced with a goalless draw in the second leg. In the final, away to Kerala on 18 December, Kolkata fell behind to a goal by their former player Mohammed Rafi, and equalised before half-time with a header by defender Henrique Sereno. The game went to penalties, with Hume having Atlético's first attempt saved by Graham Stack, but Elhadji Ndoye missed for Kerala and Debjit Majumder saved from Cédric Hengbart to win Kolkata the title.

2017–18 season

After the separation from Spanish club Atlético Madrid, most of the squad was not retained for the new season. On 14 July 2017, ATK appointed former England international striker Teddy Sheringham as their head coach for the upcoming season. While former Bengaluru FC head coach Ashley Westwood was appointed as the technical director for the club. On 4 August, the team acquired former Irish international forward Robbie Keane as their new marquee player.

On 24 January 2018, Sheringham was sacked by ATK after winning only three of his ten games in charge and appointed Ashley Westwood as their interim coach. For the first time in four years the club could not make it to the playoffs, but avoided last place by registering a 1–0 win over NorthEast United FC in the final game, Robbie Keane netting the deciding goal.

Robbie Keane was named the player-manager for the upcoming cup fixtures and they started their Super Cup campaign with a 4–1 win over I League club Chennai City FC, but failed to make it to the quarter-finals after a 3–1 defeat against FC Goa.

2018–19 season

After a forgettable season, ATK appointed Sanjoy Sen as their mentor to recruit national players. The former Mohun Bagan A.C. head coach roped in some of his own former players who he had the experience of working with, along with former ATK players Arnab Mondal and Cavin Lobo. They mainly focused on more local players and it served as the main foundation for building the squad for the season. Former Manchester United striker Steve Coppell was named as the head coach for the season. Coppell had the experience of managing ISL clubs before such as Kerala Blasters FC and Jamshedpur FC. Under him the team finished 6th in the league, winning 6 games.

In the Super Cup the team reached the semi-finals. They defeated Real Kashmir 3–1 on their way to finish 4th.

2019–20 season

ATK became the first club to win the ISL thrice after they defeated Chennaiyin FC 3-1 in the final of the 2019-20 Indian Super League. On 1 July the club owners dissolved ATK and merged their brand with the football division of Mohun Bagan AC that allowed Mohun Bagan to play in the Indian Super League as ATK Mohun Bagan FC from the next season onwards.

Crest
On 7 July, the team's jersey and logo were unveiled by West Bengal Chief Minister Mamata Banerjee at the Nabanna building, temporary headquarters of the state's secretariat. The logo featured a hybrid Bengal tiger–phoenix, with the latter element being symbolic of perpetuity, due to the footballing heritage in Kolkata. Five stars above the crest symbolise the five owners of the club. The shield is striped with tigers' stripes.

Stadium

The 85,000 capacity Salt Lake Stadium was the home ground of Atlético de Kolkata. The multi-purpose stadium, located in Salt Lake City (Bidhan Nagar), in the outskirts of Kolkata, is the largest stadium in the country. The Salt Lake Stadium is owned by the West Bengal State Government. Salt Lake Stadium, officially known as Vivekananda Yuba Bharati Krirangan (VYBK), is the largest stadium in India by seating capacity. Before its renovation in 2011, it was the second-largest football stadium in the world, having a seating capacity of 120,000. Prior to the construction and opening of Rungrado May Day Stadium in 1989, it was the largest football stadium in the world. The stadium hosted the final match of the 2017 FIFA U-17 World Cup, alongside hosting other matches of the tournament.

Atlético de Kolkata played their first two seasons at Salt Lake Stadium, but in the 2016 season, they had to move to Rabindra Sarobar Stadium due to the unavailability of Salt Lake Stadium, which was shortlisted as one of the venues for the 2017 FIFA U-17 World Cup. During the first season, Atlético de Kolkata has achieved an average home attendance of 45,172 per match and the most attended game of the season with 65,000 people.

During the second season, 405,659 people attended the home matches of Kolkata (most by any club in that season) with an average of 50,707 per match, and they held the most attended game of the season for the second year in a row with 68,340 people. During the third season, an average of 11,703 people per match attended the home matches of Kolkata.

The fourth season saw a formidable decline in the average attendance in the home matches of Kolkata due to the low capacity of Rabindra sarobar stadium. The lowest attendance count was 3,165 whereas the highest was 32,816. In their nine home games, ATK managed to pull an average attendance of just 12,629.

Supporters
ATK, and the ISL in general, were initially announced with a mixed reception among football fans in Kolkata. Some locals feared that it could overshadow the development of players at the city's two long-established I-League clubs, while others saw the new franchise as a way to unite both sets of I-League supporters, who would be drawn together further by the involvement of Ganguly, who is idolised across the state.

Ahead of the second season, the franchise accredited the ATK Fans Fraternity (ATKFF), whose ₹800 membership includes a home season ticket and an official jersey. The fraternity offered 4,000 memberships in an exclusive part of the stadium. Firstpost journalist Pulasta Dhar described it as a "brilliant" deal that could be replicated in order to help all ISL clubs fill their stadia.

Ownership and finances

The Kolkata Games and Sports Pvt. Ltd is a consortium established to oversee the administration and operations of ATK of the Indian Super League. The consortium is made up of former India cricket captain Sourav Ganguly, businessmen Harshavardhan Neotia, Sanjiv Goenka, and Utsav Parekh.

The club's initial sponsors were Indian telecommunications corporation Aircel, while its partners were Kolkata-based underwear brand Lux Cozi and insurance firm Apollo Munich. In October 2015, Kolkata-based Birla Tyres agreed a deal to be the principal sponsors for the club's second and third seasons.

Last technical staff
More: List of ATK managers

Management

List of players

Statistics and records

Season-by-season

Head Coaches record

Team records

Most goals

Most appearances

Honours 
ATK's honours include the following:
Indian Super League
Champions (3): 2014, 2016, 2019–20

See also
 List of ATK players
 List of ATK records and statistics
 List of football clubs in Kolkata
 List of Indian Super League records and statistics

References

External links
 Official page on the Indian Super League website 

 
Association football clubs established in 2014
Football clubs in Kolkata
Indian Super League teams
2014 establishments in West Bengal
ATK (football club) owners
Association football clubs disestablished in 2020
Defunct football clubs in India
2020 disestablishments in India
ATK Mohun Bagan FC